Everardo Rios (born 12 May 1915, date of death unknown) was a Mexican gymnast. He competed in eight events at the 1948 Summer Olympics.

References

1915 births
Year of death missing
Mexican male artistic gymnasts
Olympic gymnasts of Mexico
Gymnasts at the 1948 Summer Olympics
Place of birth missing
20th-century Mexican people